Nematogmus dentimanus, is a species of spider of the genus Nematogmus. It is found from Sri Lanka to Malaysia, Java, Krakatau.

See also
 List of Linyphiidae species

References

External links
A taxonomic study of Chinese Nematogmus species (Araneae, Linyphiidae)

Linyphiidae
Spiders of Asia
Spiders of Indonesia
Arthropods of Sri Lanka
Invertebrates of Malaysia
Spiders described in 1886